Umuahia North is a Local Government Area of Abia State, Nigeria. Its headquarters are in the city of Umuahia.

It has an area of 245 km and a population of 220,660 at the 2006 census.

The postal code of the area is 440.

Localities 
Towns and Villages in Umuahia North Local Government:

 Umuahia 
 Umukabia
 Umuawa Alaocha
  Amaogwugwu
 Umuagu
 Umuekwule
 Ofeme
 Umuda Isingwu
 Nkwoegwu

See also 
 List of villages in Abia State

References

Nnadozie obioma (2014)the geographical location of Abia state and its local governments Pp 14

Local Government Areas in Abia State